The Puerto Rico Chamber of Commerce  (CCPR) is a private, voluntary, and non-profit chamber of commerce in Puerto Rico. The Chamber was formed in 1913 as the San Juan Securities and Supplies Llotja by a group of businessmen for the purpose of mutual protection in matters strictly related to their individual companies. Originally designed to serve as a board of arbitration for the settlement of disputes between merchants, the Llotja managed to become the center of thought and the business of San Juan, and to some extent the rest of the island. Today, the Chamber groups businesses with presence in Puerto Rico and serves as their primary lobby group upon the Legislative Assembly of Puerto Rico.

References

External links
 www.camarapr.org - official site 

Chambers of commerce in Puerto Rico
1913 establishments in Puerto Rico